Robert I may refer to:

Robert I, Duke of Neustria (697–748)
Robert I of France (866–923), King of France, 922–923, rebelled against Charles the Simple
Rollo, Duke of Normandy (c. 846 – c. 930; reigned 911–927)
Robert I Archbishop of Rouen (d. 1037), Archbishop of Rouen, 989–1037, son of Duke Richard I of Normandy
Robert the Magnificent (1000–1035), also named Robert I, Duke of Normandy, 1027–1035), father of William the Conqueror. Sometimes known as Robert II, with Rollo of Normandy, c. 860 – c. 932, as Robert I because Robert was his baptismal name when he became a Christian
Robert I, Duke of Burgundy (1011–1076), Duke of Burgundy, 1032–1076
Robert I, Count of Flanders (1029–1093), also named Robert the Frisian, Count of Flanders, 1071–1093
Robert I de Brus (ca. 1078 – 1141/1142)
Robert I of Dreux (c. 1123 – 1188), Count of Braine in France, son of King Louis VI
Robert I of Artois (1216–1250), son of King Louis VIII of France
Robert I of Scotland (1274–1329), also named Robert the Bruce, King of Scotland, 1306–1329, helped achieve Scotland's independence
Robert of Naples (1277–1343), King of Naples, 1309–1343, son of King Charles II of Naples
Robert Estienne (1503–1559), scholar-printer and son of Henry Estienne
Rupprecht, Crown Prince of Bavaria (1869–1955)